Darby & Joan is the third album by Canadian singer-songwriter Gentleman Reg, released in 2004 on Three Gut Records.

Track listing
 "Bundle"
 "Over My Head"
 "First Time Everything"
 "It's Not Safe"
 "All My Love"
 "Untouchable"
 "The Deal"
 "You Make Me Tall"
 "Don't Bring Me Down"
 "The Boyfriend Song"
 "Get it Together"
 "Navy Brown"

2004 albums
Gentleman Reg albums
Three Gut Records albums